Cubao Cathedral (formal title: The Immaculate Conception Cathedral of Cubao), is a Roman Catholic cathedral located in Quezon City, Metro Manila, the Philippines. It is the episcopal seat of the Roman Catholic Bishop of Cubao. Built in 1950 by the Society of the Divine Word, it belonged to the order until 1990, when the Archdiocese of Manila took over its administration. In 2003, when the Diocese of Cubao was erected, the parish was elevated into the status of cathedral. The present rector of the cathedral is Rev. Fr. Dennis S. Soriano, M.A., Lit.

History
In 1935, the SVD priests of Christ the King Mission Seminary began ministering to a limited farming community around Manga Road in Cubao by first celebrating Mass in a small chapel near the present Cubao roundabout. Fr. Henry Demond, SVD, then celebrated Mass in the house of a certain Carbonell family, then moved to a quonset mess hall from the Second World War that stood on what are now Spencer and Brooklyn streets. The building was abandoned by the combined US-Philippine Commonwealth Armed Forces.

As with other agrarian communities, farmers tilling the area's rice paddies invoked San Isidro Labrador, so the chapel was dedicated to him and belonged to Sacred Heart Parish in the Kamuníng area. While teaching as theology professor at Christ the King Mission Seminary (and later as Prefect of Scholastics), Fr. Ambrosio Manaligod and Ronnie Ganancias consistently helped with the pastoral work of the parish, especially in directing lay organisations.

In 1949, the chapel was re-dedicated to the Immaculate Conception. On 15 July 1950, the community chapel was elevated into a parish, with the first curé being the Argentine Fr. Juan Simón (1950–1954); he was succeeded by the German Fr. Alois Vogel (1954-1956) and Fr. Benito Rixner (1956–1958). For years, the parish remained under the SVD, as it was near the order's main residence at Christ the King Mission Seminary.

In 1989, the SVD offered the parish to the Archdiocese of Manila in keeping with the missionary spirit found in their constitutions. The official handover took place on Easter Sunday, 1990, with Msgr. Reynaldo Celso as the first secular or diocesan parish priest. Due to an increase in the population of Catholics in Metro Manila, the Archdiocese was gradually partitioned, with the Diocese of Cubao erected on 28 August 2003. The parish was selected to be the see for the new bishop, and extensive renovations on the church were carried out soon after.

On December 30, 2014, GMA Network, actor Dingdong Dantes and actress Marian Rivera were married at Cubao Cathedral, where Dantes was christened. Considered one of the most expensive church weddings held in the country, guests included then-President Benigno S. Aquino III as the principal sponsor, other politicians, the couple's colleagues from the television and film industry, and various celebrities.

Ecclesiastical territory
The Immaculate Conception Cathedral once belonged to the Archdiocese of Manila, but is now the seat of the Diocese of Cubao. However, it is currently remains a parish in its own right as a part of the Vicariate of the Holy Family.

Parochial bounds
The parish itself is bounded to the north by a creek running Eulogio Rodriguez Sr. and Ermín García Avenues; to the east by EDSA; to the south by Col. Bonny Serrano Avenue (Santolan Road); and to the southwest by a small portion of Ermitaño Creek, parts of Horseshoe Village, N. Domingo Street and Balete Drive.

Surrounding parishes are Sacred Heart to the north; Nativity of Our Lord and Our Lady of Perpetual Help to the east; and the Minor Basilica Our Lady of Mount Carmel to the west. To the south is San Juan, which is under the jurisdiction of the Archdiocese of Manila.

Parish Priests

Below is a list of parish priests, and upon the church's elevation to cathedral in 2003, rectors.

Society of the Divine Word administration

Diocesan administration

See also
Roman Catholic Diocese of Cubao
Archdiocese of Manila

Resources
 Ecclesiastical Atlas Roman Catholic Diocese of Cubao (2010) 
The 2008–2009 Catholic Directory of the Philippines (published by Claretian Publications for the Catholic Bishops' Conference of the Philippines, June 2008)

External links

 Website
 

1950 establishments in the Philippines
Roman Catholic churches in Quezon City
Roman Catholic cathedrals in the Philippines
Divine Word Missionaries Order
Churches in the Roman Catholic Diocese of Cubao